Debregeasia  is a genus of plants belonging to the family Urticaceae.

Species

References 

 
Urticaceae genera